Sofiyevka is a rural locality (a village) in Karanovsky Selsoviet, Miyakinsky District, Bashkortostan, Russia. The population was 136 as of 2010. There are two streets.

Geography 
Sofiyevka is located 30 km northeast of Kirgiz-Miyaki (the district's administrative centre) by road. Zaypekul is the nearest rural locality.

References 

Rural localities in Miyakinsky District